was a castle built in Mino Province in Japan during the late-Heian period (late 12th century); it was destroyed during the Sengoku period in the mid-16th century. The castle's ruins are located in the present-day city of Gifu, Gifu Prefecture. It stood at the peak of Mount Sagi, which was only . Because the castle was built as a residence and not a defensive fortress, its location on a small mountain was of little consequence.

History
Sagiyama Castle was built by Satake Hideyoshi between 1185 and 1190. It served as a main castle for the Toki clan, who were the shugo of Mino Province at the time, at first. However, after the construction of Kawate Castle to the south in 1353, Sagiyama Castle no longer played an important role in the area. Toki Yorinari moved into the castle in the early 16th century, but chose to live in Kawate Castle after becoming the shugo.

After Saitō Dōsan usurped power from the Toki clan in 1530, he moved the area's power into Inabayama Castle atop Mount Kinka. However, he occasionally took refuge in Sagiyama Castle because of its ease of access. Dōsan gave possession of Sagiyama Castle to his son, Saitō Yoshitatsu, in 1548 after some repairs. Originally, Dōsan was planning on naming Yoshitatsu as his successor, but when Yoshitatsu heard that Dōsan might choose another son, Yoshitatsu killed his two brothers. The murders led to the Battle of Nagaragawa between Dōsan and Yoshitatsu in 1556, which resulted in Dōsan's death and the destruction of the castle.

Present
In 1964, during the construction of the Tōkaidō Shinkansen and the Meishin Expressway, dirt and stones from Mount Sagi were used, reducing the size of the mountain. During the excavation, however, stones thought to have formed the base of the castle were discovered.

Though much of the castle is gone, what remains, including earthen walls and a moat, are protected.

References

Buildings and structures completed in 1190
Buildings and structures in Gifu
Castles in Gifu Prefecture
Historic Sites of Japan
Former castles in Japan
Ruined castles in Japan